

Tobias was a medieval Bishop of Rochester. He was consecrated between 699 and 716. He died in 726. According to Bede (5.23), he was as skilled in Latin and Greek as in his native language, and highly learned in sacred and secular literature. His teachers were archbishop Theodoric and abbot Hadrian. Bede reports that he was buried in the 'portico' (in porticu) of St Paul the Apostle, a space he had created for his own burial within the church of St Andrew (i.e. the cathedral of Rochester).

Citations

References

External links
 

Bishops of Rochester
8th-century English bishops
726 deaths
Year of birth unknown